Mayo-Kani   is a department of Extreme-Nord Province in Cameroon. The department covers an area of 5,033 km and at the 2005 Census had a total population of 404,646. The capital of the department is at Kaélé.

Subdivisions
The department is divided administratively into 7 communes and in turn into villages.

Communes 
 Dziguilao
 Guidiguis
 Kaélé
 Mindif
 Moulvoudaye
 Moutourwa
 Touloum

References

Departments of Cameroon
Far North Region (Cameroon)